Morice Benin, born Moïse Ben-Haïm (21 July 1947 – 19 January 2021) was a French singer-songwriter.

Biography
Moïse Ben-Haïm was born in Casablanca on 21 July 1947. His family shortly thereafter moved to France and francized the family named to Benin. Therefore, he took the name Maurice. He again changed his first name to "Morice" for his singing career.

Morice Benin died in Die on 19 January 2021 at the age of 73.

Discography

Studio albums
Peut-être (1972)
Il faudrait toujours pénétrer les gens… (1973)
Je vis (1974)
Peut-être (1975)
C'était en … (1976)
Tu vois c'que j'veux dire (1978)
Passage (1980)
Apocalypse (1981)
Sémaphore (1982)
Aimer sans issue (1983)
Chants de solitude (1984)
Chemin d'Alliance (1985)
Escale (1987)
Respirer (1988)
La Cinquième Saison (1990)
Essentiel (1991)
Funambule amoureux (1996)
La vie à tous (1999)
Vie Vent (2000)
Breizh ardente (2001)
In'spir (2001)
Après le déluge (2002)
La Mémoire et la Mer (2003)
Être (2005)
Pour prendre le large (2008)
Atteindre (2009)
L'Élan (2009)
Arpenteurs (2009)
Des astres annoncés (2012)
Infiniment (2014)
L'Inespéré, entre les lignes… (2017)
L'air de rien (2018)
Juste l'heure (2020)

Compilations
De je vis… en escale (1988)
Des pays…à ...respirer (1991)
Je chante…pour demain (1995)
Comme un fleuve (1998)
Ose…la petite vie (1998)
Chanter… souffle d'homme (2003)

EPs
Rage de dents (1969)
Maurice Benin Chante (1972)
Résister (1987)
Dessine moi un enfant (1987)
Couleurs (1991)
Ici Terre (1995)
Différents (1998)
Je vais vous dire un secret (2001)
Florilège (2008)

Awards
Prize of the Académie Charles Cros (1985)

References

External links
 

1947 births
2021 deaths
French male singer-songwriters
French singer-songwriters
French people of Moroccan descent
Male guitarists
20th-century French musicians
21st-century French musicians
20th-century French male singers
21st-century French male singers